was a Rinzai Buddhist temple and royal bodaiji of the Ryūkyū Kingdom, located in Naha, Okinawa. 

Tennō-ji was the house of Shō En before he ascended the throne. Shō Shin was born here. The house changed in usage and became a Buddhist temple during the reign of King Shō Shin (r. 1477–1526). It also used as bodaiji of Ryukyuan queens. Ryukyuan king should visit Enkaku-ji, Tennō-ji and Tenkai-ji after his genpuku and investiture. 

Ryukyu was annexed by Japan in 1879, and Tennō-ji was closed in the same year and buddharupa, spirit tablets and bonshō were moved to Enkaku-ji. The  was used as a classroom of a school; the western part of the temple was bought by Methodists who built a church on it. It was destroyed in the 1945 battle of Okinawa.

See also
Enkaku-ji (Okinawa)
Tenkai-ji
Sōgen-ji

References 

15th-century Buddhist temples
Buddhist temples in Okinawa Prefecture
1879 disestablishments